Combat readiness is a condition of the armed forces and their constituent units and formations, warships, aircraft, weapon systems or other military technology and equipment to perform during combat military operations, or functions consistent with the purpose for which they are organized or designed, or the managing of resources and personnel training in preparation for combat.

Most armed forces maintain varying levels of readiness by the troops to engage in combat due to economic considerations which vary from minutes to months. In modern armed forces troops designated special forces are usually those kept at the highest state of readiness for combat, and are often alerted only a few hours before being committed to combat. Where time is of the essence in military action being initiated, the troops, such as pilots of interceptor aircraft, may be kept in constant state of combat readiness.

See also
Alert crew
Alert state
COGCON
DEFCON
Mobilization
Scrambling (military)

References

Citations
Andrews, Robert P. & Shambo, James F., (thesis), A system dynamics analysis of the factors affecting combat readiness, Faculty of the School of Systems and Logistics of the Air Force Institute of Technology, Air Uhiversity, June 1980 
Jordan, Thomas M., Col. (US Army), Improving Combat Readiness: Developing and Implementing Effective Training, Infantry Magazine,  Sept-Dec 2000 
Kruys, G.P.H., Combat readiness with specific reference to armies, (Chapter Five), Institute for Strategic Studies, University of Pretoria, Institute for Strategic Studies 2001

Further reading
Pry, Peter Vincent, War Scare: Russia and America on the Nuclear Brink, Greenwood Publishing Group, 1999 
Betts, Richard K., Military Readiness: Concepts, Choices, Consequences, Brookings Institution Press, 1995 

Military organization
Military science
Alert measurement systems

de:Gefechtsbereitschaft